Bilky is a village in Khust Raion of Zakarpattia Oblast, Ukraine, but was formerly administrated under Irshava Raion.
The village covers an area of 4,4 km2. The population of village is about  8 064 persons and Local government is administered by Bilkivska village council.

Geography 

History 
The first written record of village Bilky dates back to the 17th century. By King Béla IV of Hungary, King of Hungary and Croatia, was made a present and gave royal charter in 1245.
But in the village found the remains of three settlements in of the Neolithic (IV-III millennium BC). Been preserved remains of the Slavic of the settlement 8th-9th century AD.

Religious organizations 
In the village there are religious community of the Ukrainian Greek Catholic Church and Ukrainian Orthodox Church. There are two temples.
 Church of Saints Peter and Paul of Ukrainian Orthodox Church (1939).
 Holy Assumption church of Ukrainian Greek Catholic Churches (UGCC) (1838).

References

External links 
 Про село Білки з енциклопедіїї міст і сіл УРСР, Закарпатська область 
 weather.in.ua/ Bilky (Zakarpattia (Transcarpathian) region)
 Друга проща закарпатських журналістів пролягла Боржавською долиною 
 Церква Успіння/Білки Іршавський район 
 Церква св. Петра і Павла/Білки Іршавський район 

Villages in Khust Raion